The Big Show  may refer to:

People
Big Show (born 1972), professional wrestler, real name Paul Wight
Glenn Maxwell (born 1988), Australian cricket player nicknamed "The Big Show"
Jared Rosholt (born 1986), American mixed martial arts fighter nicknamed "The Big Show"

Film
The Big Show (1923 film), the ninth Our Gang short subject comedy released
The Big Show (1926 film), American silent film directed by George Terwilliger
The Big Show (1936 film), American film starring Gene Autry
The Big Show (1960 film), French-Spanish drama film directed by Francisco Rovira Beleta
The Big Show (1961 film), American film starring Esther Williams

Radio
The Big Show (NBC Radio), an American radio program from the 1950s
The Big Show (TV series), a 1980 adaptation of the 1950s radio program
The Big Show (sports radio show), radio show on WEEI in Boston, Massachusetts
The John Boy & Billy Big Show, morning radio show in the southern United States
Steve Wright in the Afternoon, a UK national afternoon radio show on BBC Radio 2 often referred to as The Big Show
The Big Broadcast, a movie and several vintage-style radio programs

Television
 The Big Show (Chicago TV show), a 1960s Chicago WBKB-TV after school movie program
The CCTV New Year's Gala, which is broadcast on the eve of the Chinese New Year
"The Big Show" (Steven Universe), a 2018 episode of Steven Universe
Michael McIntyre's Big Show, a British stand-up comedy show
The Big Show Show, an American sitcom television series featuring professional wrestler Big Show
Go-Big Show, an American talent show television series

Other
Major League Baseball, in the context of players being promoted from or demoted to the minor leagues
Retail's BIG Show, a retail trade show
The Big Show (Le Grand Cirque), a book by French flying ace Pierre Clostermann
"The Big Show", a song by Basshunter from his The Bassmachine album
Various radio and television shows pairing Dan Patrick with Keith Olbermann